The 1966–67 Alpha Ethniki was the 31st season of the highest football league of Greece. The season began on 23 October 1966 and ended on 18 June 1967. Olympiacos won their second consecutive and 17th Greek title.

The point system was: Win: 3 points - Draw: 2 points - Loss: 1 point.

League table

Results

Top scorers

External links
Greek Wikipedia
Official Greek FA Site
Greek SuperLeague official Site
SuperLeague Statistics

Alpha Ethniki seasons
Greece
1966–67 in Greek football leagues